Carrie Hope Fletcher (born 22 October 1992) is an English actress, singer-songwriter, author and internet personality. Having played the roles of Éponine and  Fantine in Les Misérables, she has also starred in the original British production of Heathers: The Musical and in the original production of Cinderella .  

In 2015 Fletcher published a book called: All I Know Now: Wonderings and Reflections on Growing Up Gracefully, which was a Number 1 bestseller in the UK. Since then, she has published three novels and two children's books.

Fletcher is a two-time Grammy Award nominee and a three-time winner of the WhatsOnStage Award for Best Actress in a Musical.

Life and career

Personal Life
Fletcher was born and grew up in South Harrow in the London borough of Harrow, the daughter of Debbie and Bob Fletcher. Her older brother, Tom Fletcher, is lead vocalist and guitarist of the band McFly. As a child, Fletcher played small roles on television and appeared in musical theatre in London's West End in Chitty Chitty Bang Bang, Mary Poppins and Les Miserables. In 2011, she started a YouTube channel called ItsWayPastMyBedTime, later retitled Carrie Hope Fletcher, which features music and vlogs.

Fletcher left school at age 16, and has no formal training in musical theatre.

In 2023, Fletcher married fellow actor Joel Montague.

Theatre

Fletcher made her West End debut as Young Éponine in Les Misérables at the age of nine in 2001. In 2002, she was part of the original cast of Chitty Chitty Bang Bang (musical) in the role of Jemima Potts, and in 2004 featured as Jane Banks in Mary Poppins. Fletcher replaced Danielle Hope as Éponine in Les Misérables at the Queen's Theatre, London in June 2013. She is the only British actress to have played young Éponine, older Éponine and Fantine in the production. On 23 February 2014, Fletcher was presented the WhatsOnStage "Best Takeover in a Role" award for her performance as Éponine.

In November 2014, Fletcher took a hiatus from her role in Les Misérables to join the cast of Jeff Wayne's War of the Worlds national arena tour in which she played the role of Beth, alongside Jason Donovan, Brian McFadden and Shayne Ward.

She next returned to Les Misérables, playing Éponine for the musical's 30th anniversary gala performance on 8 October 2015. Fletcher played her final performance on 13 February 2016, at which time she was the longest-running Éponine in the London production's 30-year history.

In 2017, she played the role of Wednesday Addams on the UK tour of The Addams Family. The production was produced by James Yeoburn and Stuart Matthew Price for United Theatrical and Music & Lyrics in association with Festival Theatre, Edinburgh. In December 2017, she performed in the musical The Christmasaurus. Based on her brother Tom Fletcher’s novel of the same name. It was performed at The Hammersmith Apollo. 

In 2018, Fletcher played Veronica in the Original West End Production of   Heathers: The Musical . The show is an adaptation of the movie of the same name. First of all, it was performed at  The Other Palace. Moving into the West End it was performed at the  Theatre Royal Haymarket . Also  she reprised her role as Beth in the 40th anniversary tour of Jeff Wayne's War of the Worlds.

In 2019, she returned to Les Misérables as Fantine at the Gielgud Theatre, in a fully staged concert adaptation of the musical.

Fletcher was announced to be playing  Cinderella in Andrew Lloyd Webber’s retelling in February 2020. Prior to the announcement, she workshopped  Cinderella at The Other Palace Theatre in 2019. It opened in August 2021. Fletcher won the WHATSONSTAGE Award for Best actress in a musical. The production closed on 12 June 2022, 8 months early. Fletcher and other cast members who were not present at 1 May’s matinee were not informed of the closure until after the public announcement.

After the closure of Cinderella, Fletcher appeared in two concert versions of musicals: The Witches of Eastwick as Sukie, and Treason the Musical as Martha Percy. In October 2022, she portrayed Grusha in Brecht’s The Caucasian Chalk Circle at the Rose Theatre Kingston. This was her first professional play. During the Christmas season, Fletcher starred in her pantomime debut as Carabosse in Sleeping Beauty. This was performed at the  Marlowe Theatre.

Writing
In April 2015, Fletcher released her first book, All I Know Now: Wonderings and Reflections on Growing Up Gracefully, based on her blog of the same name. The non-fiction book focuses on stages of Fletcher's life as a teenager and passes on life lessons and advice through highlighting her own mistakes and struggles as she grew up. Her book was a number one Sunday Times bestseller and remained in the Top 10 list for seven weeks.

Music
Fletcher has produced two singles, "Running Through Rivers" and "The Way We Were". She performed to benefit the band Sheytoons at the St. James Theatre, as well as Ramin Karimloo on his 2012 Road to Find Out tour.

In 2012, she performed the official 2012 Summer Olympics mascots song with her brother, Tom.

Fletcher is featured in Alex Day’s 2013 album Epigrams and Interludes on the songs covering "Poison" and "This Kiss". Fletcher can also be seen in The Vamps' music video for their cover of McFly's "That Girl". In 2014, Fletcher had featured in Daniel Koek's album High in the song "Remember Me". Koek was a fellow cast member of Fletcher's in Les Misérables.

Her most successful video on YouTube, currently with 1.5 million views (as of 14 April 2020), is a live interpretation together with her brother Tom Fletcher of the McFly song "Love Is on the Radio".

Fletcher released her first solo album When The Curtain Falls on 30 March 2018. It was released via musical theatre concert and record producers Club 11 London and accompanied her first four solo concerts at Cadogan Hall, London, on 31 March and 1 April 2018.

Discography

Studio albums

Singles

Music videos

Cast recordings

Theatre credits

References

External links
 

New media artists
Living people
British Internet celebrities
English video bloggers
DFTBA Records creators
People from Harrow, London
English musical theatre actresses
English stage actresses
English YouTubers
English non-fiction writers
British women bloggers
1992 births